Stigmella lediella is a moth of the family Nepticulidae. It is found from Fennoscandia to the Alps. It is also present in Japan.

The wingspan is 5–6 mm.

The larvae feed on Rhododendron tomentosum. They mine the leaves of their host plant. The mine consists of a gradually widening corridor that generally follows the leaf margin for most of its length. The frass is concentrated in central line. Pupation takes place outside of the mine.

External links
Fauna Europaea
bladmineerders.nl
Swedish Moths

Nepticulidae
Moths of Europe
Moths of Asia
Moths described in 1867